Agnieszka Wagner (born 17 December 1970) is a Polish actress. She has appeared in more than fifty films since 1989.

Selected filmography

References

External links 

1970 births
Living people
Polish film actresses
Polish people of German descent